Selivanov is a rural locality (a khutor) in Zakharovskoye Rural Settlement, Kletsky District, Volgograd Oblast, Russia. The population was 227 as of 2010. There are 5 streets.

Geography 
Selivanov is located on the bank of the Kurtlak River, 29 km southwest of Kletskaya (the district's administrative centre) by road. Gvardeysky is the nearest rural locality.

References 

Rural localities in Kletsky District